Sailing is the third studio album by South Korean brother-sister duo AKMU. It was released on September 25, 2019, through YG Entertainment. All the tracks' lyrics and music were written by member Lee Chan-hyuk. The album was supported by the single "How Can I Love the Heartbreak, You're the One I Love", which reached atop on the Gaon Digital Chart and Billboards K-pop Hot 100. Sailing received generally positive reviews from music critics, many of whom complimented AKMU's stylistic shift from their previous releases to more musical maturity.

Background
In September 2017, AKMU member–Lee Chan-hyuk–went on hiatus to enlist for his obligatory military service; he was discharged in May 2019. On September 5, 2019, AKMU's agency YG Entertainment released a poster notifying their comeback in two years and two months, since Summer Episode in July 2017. Next day, disclosing a teaser video, YG Entertainment announced the release of AKMU's third full-length album, titled Sailing. On September 9, YG Entertainment informed that the album would be released on 25th, and unveiled a teaser poster.

Critical reception

In an article for Korea JoongAng Daily, Kim Eun-jin wrote that AKMU "takes a sharp turn from the bright and bubbly tones that characterized their earlier music. ... With lyrics that discuss topics like freedom expressed through sentimental melodies and acoustic sounds, Sailing is an album that reflects the depth and maturity." In the album review, IZMs Park Soo-jin gave a four-star rating out of five, and said that "this album backslashes genres and expresses them without boundaries," and concluded by writing that Sailing "will be the pinnacle of broadening AKMU's spectrum." Tamar Herman of Billboard said that the "album features songs that show the pair's artistic development, exploring a variety of new genres all the while still incorporating their distinctly vibrant, soulful folk-pop sound." The publication additionally ranked "How Can I Love the Heartbreak, You're the One I Love" number 7 in their list of 25 Best K-pop Songs of 2019.

Accolades

Track listing
Credits adapted from Melon and Apple Music.

Charts

Sales

Release history

Notes

References

AKMU albums
2019 albums
YG Entertainment albums
Korean-language albums